Willi Lindner (27 June 1910 – 5 March 1944) was a German footballer.

While signed at Eintracht Frankfurt he gained his only cap for the Germany national football team in Berlin against France. Then manager Otto Nerz substituted him for Richard Hofmann in the half time break since the crowd wanted to see Hofmann play.

Lindner fought in World War II, and died on the Eastern Front in 1944.

External links 
 Willi Lindner at eintracht-archiv.de 

1910 births
1944 deaths
Footballers from Frankfurt
German footballers
Germany international footballers
Association football midfielders
Eintracht Frankfurt players
Tennis Borussia Berlin players
German football managers
Eintracht Frankfurt managers
German military personnel killed in World War II